Sonia Isabel Heredia Condemarin (born 23 November 1963) is a Peruvian former volleyball player who competed in the 1984 Summer Olympics and in the 1988 Summer Olympics.

References

External links
 
 

1963 births
Living people
Olympic volleyball players of Peru
Volleyball players at the 1984 Summer Olympics
Volleyball players at the 1988 Summer Olympics
Olympic silver medalists for Peru
Olympic medalists in volleyball
Medalists at the 1988 Summer Olympics
Peruvian women's volleyball players
Volleyball players at the 1987 Pan American Games
Medalists at the 1987 Pan American Games
Pan American Games silver medalists for Peru
Pan American Games medalists in volleyball
20th-century Peruvian women